Arsenio Chirinos (14 December 1934 – 13 October 2015) was a Venezuelan cyclist. He competed at the 1956 Summer Olympics and the 1960 Summer Olympics.

References

1934 births
2015 deaths
Venezuelan male cyclists
Olympic cyclists of Venezuela
Cyclists at the 1956 Summer Olympics
Cyclists at the 1960 Summer Olympics
Sportspeople from Caracas
20th-century Venezuelan people